In the Shadows is a 2010 German crime film directed by Thomas Arslan. The film premiered at the 2010 Berlin International Film Festival, and released to German theatres on 7 October 2010.

Cast 
 Mišel Matičević as Trojan
 Karoline Eichhorn as Dora Hillmann
 Uwe Bohm as Meyer
 Rainer Bock as Nico
 David Scheller as Martin Krüger
 Peter Kurth as Richard Bauer
 Hanns Zischler as Der Planer
  as Dragan

References

External links 

2010 crime films
2010 films
German crime films
Films about organized crime in Germany
2010s German films